Wynkoop or Wyncoop can refer to:
 Benjamin Wynkoop, silversmith
 Henry Wynkoop, politician from Pennsylvania
 Cornelius Wynkoop stone house
 Joel Wynkoop, American actor
 Wynkoop Brewing Company
 Mildred Bangs Wynkoop, evangelical minister and theologian
 Edward W. Wynkoop, Union Army officer, Indian agent, a founder of Denver
 Gerardus Wynkoop II, Speaker of the Pennsylvania House of Representatives in 1793
 Wynkoop Spring, West Virginia
 Wyncoop Run, a stream in Pennsylvania